Vamsi (also known as Vamsee) is a 2000 Indian Telugu-language romantic action film directed by B. Gopal. Produced by Padmalaya Studios, the film stars Krishna, Mahesh Babu, and Namrata Shirodkar. Music was composed by Mani Sharma. It was not commercially successful. Mahesh Babu fell in love with Namrata on the sets of the film and the two of them later got married.

Plot
Vamsi is a talented and successful fashion designer who gets an opportunity to participate in a designer's contest held in Australia. Vamsi has a colleague called Sneha, who is selected to model his creations in the fashion contest. Since Vamsi has to study the culture of Australia to design the best outfit, he is asked to tour Australia extensively for a month. Silpa is the daughter of an industrialist Ankineedu Prasad, who is studying in Australia. She decides to take a vacation after exams by touring the Australian country. Silpa meets Vamsi in the tour and she slowly falls in love with him.

After the trip is over, Sneha, who loves Vamsi, learns that Silpa and Vamsi are getting close. She trips and falls down the stairs and gets injured. When Vamsi is disappointed since his model friend is injured, Silpa surprises him by entering the contest with Vamsi's designs and winning the first prize for him. When Vamsi and Silpa are returning to India, Sneha decides to stay back as she thinks that an Indian model will fare better in Australia than India. Silpa lets her father know about her love for Vamsi. He warns Vamsi not to go after his daughter. After a couple of fights, Silpa decides to marry Vamsi in a temple. As Silpa escapes from home to meet Vamsi in the temple, Arjun kidnaps her. After waiting for Silpa, Vamsi goes to Silpa's house to inquire about her. Ankineedu puts him behind bars on the charge of kidnapping his daughter. After learning that Arjun has kidnapped his daughter, Ankineedu bails out Vamsi and begs him to save his daughter. He also agrees to marry his daughter to Vamsi. The story is more about Arjun taking revenge on the bad guys, which includes Ankineedu and his other gang members, Jaya Prakash Reddy and Kota Srinivasa Rao.

Cast

 Krishna as Arjun
 Mahesh Babu as Vamsi
 Namrata Shirodkar as Silpa
 Mayuri Kango as Sneha
 Nassar as Ankineedu Prasad
 Mukesh Tiwari as Charan Singh
 Kota Srinivasa Rao as Ankineedu's gang member
 Jaya Prakash Reddy as Ramineedu, Ankineedu's elder brother and gang member
 M. S. Narayana as Ankineedu's assistant 
 Ali as Vamsi's friend
 Venu Madhav as Vamsi's friend
 L. B. Sriram
 Brahmanandam as Jackal (guest appearance)
 Tanikella Bharani as Satya (guest appearance)
 Deepak Jethi

Soundtrack

Music was composed by Mani Sharma.

Reception 
Rediff gave the film a negative review and noted, "Take an ordinary Telugu film. Spice it up well with masala. Add sizzling dance numbers. And you get the ingredients of a good dish called Vamsi". Full Hyderabad also gave a negative review and opined, "This one is okay for a lazy Sunday evening in front of the telly, but watching it in a theater paying good money is too much optimism". On the contrary, Idlebrain gave the film a rating of three out of five and criticized the last 30 minutes of the film.

References

External links
 

2000 films
Films directed by B. Gopal
Films scored by Mani Sharma
2000s Telugu-language films
Indian action drama films
Films shot in Australia
2000 action drama films